No. 666 Squadron was a Royal Air Force Air Observation Post (AOP) squadron associated with the Canadian 1st Army and later part of the Royal Auxiliary Air Force. Numbers 651 to 663 Squadron of the RAF were Air Observation Post units working closely with British Army units in artillery spotting and liaison. A further three of these squadrons, 664–666, were manned with Canadian personnel. Their duties and squadron numbers were transferred to the Army with the formation of the Army Air Corps on 1 September 1957

History

Formation and World War II
No. 666 Squadron RCAF was first formed on 5 March 1945 at RAF Andover as an air observation post (AOP) squadron associated with the Canadian 1st Army. After a period working together with the Canadian army and later with the occupation forces in Germany the squadron disbanded on 30 September 1946.

Post-war
As the number was not transferred to the Canadian authorities, it was revived post-war when the squadron was reformed as No. 666 (Scottish) Squadron RAuxAF, part of the RAuxAF on 1 May 1949 at Scone. Equipped with Auster AOP.6 aircraft, the squadron's headquarters was located at RAF Perth/Scone, with three detached flights, Nos. 1966, 1967 and 1968 Flight RAF at respectively RAF Perth/Scone, RAF Renfrew (later RAF Abbotsinch) and RAF Turnhouse, before it was disbanded on 10 March 1957 by transferring to the Army Air Corps.

Present
The squadron was represented by 666 Squadron of 7 (Volunteer) Regiment, Army Air Corps until 1 April 2009.

Aircraft operated

Squadron bases

Fictional service
A fictional 666 Squadron featured in the Air Ace Picture Library story The Bomber Barons.  This 666 Squadron was a bomber unit founded at the outbreak of World War II, operating Handley Page Hampdens (September 1939 – December 1940), Avro Manchesters (January 1941 – 1942), Avro Lancasters (1942–1944) and Avro Vulcans (1960s – 1982). In the long-running series of 'Biggles' books by W.E. Johns, 666 Squadron, RAF, is the Special Duties squadron led by the eponymous hero James Bigglesworth during World War II. In the Charles Stross novel "The Fuller Memorandum" 666 Squadron is a secret RAF unit involved on occult activities.

See also
 No. 666 Squadron RCAF
 Army Air Corps (United Kingdom)

References

Notes

Bibliography

External links
 History of No. 666 Squadron at Army Air Corps website
 The Air Observation Post Squadrons of the RAF
 History of No.'s 651–670 Squadrons at RAF Web
 History of 666 Squadron

666 Squadron
Military units and formations established in 1949